Ladislao Szabo (born 11 April 1923) is a Hungarian-born Argentine former water polo player who competed in the 1948 Summer Olympics and in the 1952 Summer Olympics. He was born in Budapest.

References

External links
  

1923 births
Possibly living people
Sportspeople from Budapest
Argentine male water polo players
Hungarian emigrants to Argentina
Naturalized citizens of Argentina
Olympic water polo players of Argentina
Water polo players at the 1948 Summer Olympics
Water polo players at the 1952 Summer Olympics